is a Japanese professional footballer who plays as a forward or a winger for J.League club FC Machida Zelvia.

Club statistics

References

External links

Profile at Mito HollyHock 
Profile at Omiya Ardija
Profile at Júbilo Iwata

1998 births
Living people
Japanese footballers
Association football people from Saitama Prefecture
J1 League players
J2 League players
Omiya Ardija players
Mito HollyHock players
Júbilo Iwata players
FC Machida Zelvia players
Association football midfielders